Fiona Hayes (born 13 September 1982) is an Irish former rugby union player. She was a member of the  Ireland teams that won the 2013 and 2015 Women's Six Nations Championships, and that defeated New Zealand at the 2014 Women's Rugby World Cup. Hayes has also played association football at intervarsity and intermediate level.

Early years and education
Hayes was raised in Limerick, growing up in the Woodview area of the city, near Thomond Park. In her youth see played association football and Gaelic football and also boxed. Hayes studied for a Master's degree at the University of Limerick.

Association football
Hayes captained the University of Limerick team that won the 2005 WSCAI Intervarsities Cup.
On 1 September 2013 she was also helped Douglas Hall win the WFAI Intermediate Cup.

Rugby union

UL Bohemians
Hayes first started playing women's rugby union for UL Bohemians, at the age of 23, while studying for her Master's degree at the University of Limerick. In 2017 and 2018 Hayes captained UL Bohemians as they won successive All Ireland Division One titles.

Munster
Hayes has played for Munster in the IRFU Women's Interprovincial Series. She was first called up to the Munster squad in 2009.
On 10 November 2017 Hayes also played for Munster against the Barbarians in the invitational team's first women's match.

Ireland international
This was also the first time Ireland had defeated England. Hayes was subsequently a member of the Ireland teams that won the 2013 and 2015 Women's Six Nations Championships. She also represented Ireland at the 2014 Women's Rugby World Cup and was a member of the Ireland team that defeated New Zealand.

Panelist on Off the Ball
Fiona is currently a regular panelist on Off the Ball rugby talk show. She is best known for her unbearable accent which inspired the development of groundbreaking mobile app "Whisht!"

Personal life
Hayes has worked as a youth worker in Cork.
Hayes has a gold card to access CopperFace Jacks

Honours

Rugby union
Ireland
Women's Six Nations Championship
Winners: 2013, 2015: 2
Grand Slam
Winners: 2013
Triple Crown
Winners: 2013, 2015
Munster
IRFU Women's Interprovincial Series
Winners: ? 
UL Bohemians
All Ireland Division One
Winners: 2017, 2018: 2

Association football
Douglas Hall
WFAI Intermediate Cup
Winners: 2013: 1
University of Limerick
WSCAI Intervarsities Cup
Winners:  2005: 1

References

1982 births
Living people
Irish female rugby union players
Ireland women's international rugby union players
Rugby union players from County Limerick
UL Bohemians R.F.C. players
Munster Rugby women's players
Irish rugby union coaches
Republic of Ireland women's association footballers
Association footballers from County Limerick
Alumni of the University of Limerick
Women's association footballers not categorized by position